The Hazardous Materials Identification System (HMIS) is a numerical hazard rating that incorporates the use of labels with color developed by the American Coatings Association as a compliance aid for the OSHA Hazard Communication (HazCom) Standard.

HMIS Color Bar
The HMIS Color Bar is similar to the fire diamond, created by the National Fire Protection Association (NFPA).  Before 2002 the fire diamond and the color bar both had sections colored blue, red, white, and yellow.  After April 2002, with the release of HMIS III, yellow in the color bar (which stood for reactivity) was replaced by orange, standing for physical hazard.  The fire diamond is designed for emergencies when information about the effects of short, or acute, exposure is needed.  The color bar is not for emergencies and is used to convey broader health warning information. Both systems were developed at a time when there was no mandated labeling system for communicating hazards of workplace chemicals (OSHA only required some system be used without specifying a format).  In 2012, OSHA introduced an updated version of their HazCom standard known as HazCom 2012, which mandates GHS Labels on shipped containers, and updated requirements for workplace labels, which are compatible with GHS, although it does not mandate the use of GHS in the workplace. HMIS Color Bar is compliant with these new standards.  Specifically, when using HMIS III, which accounts for the increased flammability hazard of aerosols.

Symbols 
The four bars are color-coded, using the modern color bar symbols with blue indicating the level of health hazard, red for flammability, orange for a physical hazard, and white for Personal Protection.  The number ratings range from 0 to 4.

Blue (Health) 
The Health section conveys the health hazards of the material.  In the latest version of HMIS, the Health bar has two spaces, one for an asterisk and one for a numeric hazard rating.
If present, the asterisk signifies a chronic health hazard, meaning that long-term exposure to the material could cause a health problem such as emphysema or kidney damage.  According to NPCA, the numeric hazard assessment procedure differs from that used by NFPA.

 4.  Life-threatening, major or permanent damage may result from single or repeated overexposures (e.g., hydrogen cyanide).
 3.  Major injury likely unless prompt action is taken and medical treatment is given.
 2.  Temporary or minor injury may occur (e.g., diethyl ether).
 1.  Irritation or minor reversible injury possible.
 0.  No significant risk to health.

Red (Flammability) 
For HMIS I and II, the criteria used to assign numeric values (0 = low hazard to 4 = high hazard) are identical to those used by NFPA. In other words, in this category, HMIS I & II are identical to NFPA. For HMIS III, the flammability criteria are defined according to OSHA standards (which add elevated flammability ratings for aerosols). (HMIS II descriptions, excluding the new aerosol criteria, are shown below)

 4.  Flammable gases, or very volatile flammable liquids with flash points below , and boiling points below . Materials may ignite spontaneously with air (e.g., propane).
 3.  Materials capable of ignition under almost all normal temperature conditions. Includes flammable liquids with flash points below  and boiling points above , as well as liquids with flash points between 73 °F and 100 °F.
 2.  Materials which must be moderately heated or exposed to high ambient temperatures before ignition will occur.  Includes liquids having a flash point at or above  but below  (e.g., diesel fuel).
 1.  Materials that must be preheated before ignition will occur. Includes liquids, solids and semi solids having a flash point above  (e.g., canola oil).
 0.  Materials that will not burn (e.g., Water).

Yellow/Orange (Reactivity/Physical Hazard) 
Reactivity hazards are assessed using the OSHA criterion of physical hazard. Seven such hazard classes are recognized: Water Reactives, Organic Peroxides, Explosives, Compressed gases, Pyrophoric materials, Oxidizers, and Unstable Reactives.  The numerical ratings are very similar to NFPA's yellow "Reactivity/Instability" rating according to the publicly available data, which is limited to "hazard statements" intended to accompany each rating (as shown below). However, HMIS is a proprietary system, and without referring to the actual criteria for each rating, it is not clear how similar they are.

 4.  Materials that are readily capable of explosive water reaction, detonation or explosive decomposition, polymerization, or self-reaction at normal temperature and pressure (e.g., chlorine dioxide, nitroglycerin).
 3.  Materials that may form explosive mixtures with water and are capable of detonation or explosive reaction in the presence of a strong initiating source. Materials may polymerize, decompose, self-react, or undergo other chemical change at normal temperature and pressure with moderate risk of explosion (e.g., ammonium nitrate).
 2.  Materials that are unstable and may undergo violent chemical changes at normal temperature and pressure with low risk for explosion. Materials may react violently with water or form peroxides upon exposure to air (e.g., potassium, sodium).
 1.  Materials that are normally stable but can become unstable (self-react) at high temperatures and pressures. Materials may react non-violently with water or undergo hazardous polymerization in the absence of inhibitors (e.g., propene).
 0.  Materials that are normally stable, even under fire conditions, and will not react with water, polymerize, decompose, condense, or self-react. Non-explosives (e.g., helium).

White (Personal Protection) 
This is by far the largest area of difference between the NFPA and HMIS systems.  In the NFPA system, the white area is used to convey special hazards whereas HMIS uses the white section to indicate which personal protective equipment (PPE) should be used when working with the material.

A - safety glasses
B - safety glasses and gloves
C - safety glasses, gloves and an apron
D - face shield, gloves and an apron
E - safety glasses, gloves and a dust respirator
F - safety glasses, gloves, apron and a dust respirator
G - safety glasses, a vapor respirator
H - splash goggles, gloves, apron and a vapor respirator
I - safety glasses, gloves and a dust/vapor respirator
J - splash goggles, gloves, apron and a dust/vapor respirator
K - airline hood or mask, gloves, full suit and boots
X - ask supervisor or safety specialist for handling instructions.
As you can see, as you go higher in the alphabet code, the more personal protective equipment is required for the chemical. The last code of X is used for those products that require something out of the ordinary. For instance there is no letter code for just goggles and gloves. For those cases, ask you supervisor or refer to the MSDS sheet for specific directions.

See also

References

External links 
 Occupational Safety and Health Administration

Hazard analysis
Safety